New Hampshire's 3rd State Senate district is one of 24 districts in the New Hampshire Senate. It has  been represented by Republican Jeb Bradley, the current Senate Majority Leader, since 2009.

Geography
District 3 covers all of Carroll County and small parts of Grafton and Strafford Counties in the central-eastern portion of the state. It includes the towns of Albany, Bartlett, Brookfield, Chatham, Conway, Eaton, Effingham, Freedom, Hale's Location, Hart's Location, Jackson, Madison, Moultonborough, Ossipee, Sandwich, Tamworth, Tuftonboro, Wakefield, and Wolfeboro in Carroll County; Waterville Valley in Grafton County; and Middleton and Milton in Strafford County.

The district is located almost entirely within New Hampshire's 1st congressional district, with a small portion extending into the 2nd congressional district. It borders the state of Maine.

Recent election results

2020

2018

2016

2014

2012

Federal and statewide results in District 3

References

3
Carroll County, New Hampshire
Grafton County, New Hampshire
Strafford County, New Hampshire